Joan Kulowski Alexander (born 1961/1962) is a judge for the Connecticut Appellate Court. In April 2022, she was nominated to be an associate justice of the Connecticut Supreme Court

Early life and education 

Alexander earned her Bachelor of Science from Yale University in 1984, and her Juris Doctor from the University of Connecticut School of Law in 1987.

Legal career 

Prior to joining the bench, Alexander was a prosecutor with the Connecticut Division of Criminal Justice. She was assigned to the Waterbury and Hartford State's Attorneys offices, and then became supervisor of the Statewide Prosecution Bureau. During her time as prosecutor, she handled numerous homicide and arson cases.

Judicial career

Connecticut superior court 

Alexander was appointed to the superior court by Governor John G. Rowland in 2000.

Connecticut Appellate Court 

On July 20, 2020, Governor Ned Lamont announced the appointment of Alexander to the Connecticut Appellate Court to the seat being vacated by Judge Alexandra Davis DiPentima took senior status on July 31, 2020.

Connecticut Supreme Court 

On April 13, 2022, governor Ned Lamont nominated Alexander to serve as an associate justice of the Connecticut Supreme Court, the seat vacated by to justice Christine Keller, who assumed senior status on March 31, 2022.

References

External links

1960s births
Living people
20th-century American women lawyers
20th-century American lawyers
21st-century American women lawyers
21st-century American lawyers
21st-century American women judges
21st-century American judges
American women judges
Connecticut state court judges
Judges of the Connecticut Appellate Court
Superior court judges in the United States
University of Connecticut School of Law alumni
Yale University alumni